The discography of Diego Torres, an Argentine pop singer, consists of seven studio albums, one live album, one compilation album, thirty-three singles, twenty-nine music videos and two DVDs, certifications and sales are also included.

Discography

Studio albums

Live albums

Compilation albums

Other albums
1991: Compañías Indias (with his former group La Marca)

DVDs
2003: Color Esperanza
2004: Diego Torres: MTV Unplugged (Live)

Singles

1990s

2000s

2010s

Other appearances
These songs have not appeared on a studio album by Torres.

Music videos

References

External links
Diego Torres official's site
[ Diego Torres discography] at Allmusic.com

Latin pop music discographies
Discographies of Argentine artists